Jaunciems is a neighbourhood of Northern District in Riga, the capital of Latvia. It is located on the northeastern shore of Lake Ķīšezers.

External links

 

Neighbourhoods in Riga